A microphone array is any number of microphones operating in tandem. There are many applications:

 Systems for extracting voice input from ambient noise (notably telephones, speech recognition systems, hearing aids)
 Surround sound and related technologies
 Binaural recording
 Locating objects by sound: acoustic source localization, e.g., military use to locate the source(s) of artillery fire. Aircraft location and tracking.
 High fidelity original recordings
 Environmental noise monitoring
 Robotic navigation (acoustic SLAM)

Typically, an array is made up of omnidirectional microphones, directional microphones, or a mix of omnidirectional and directional microphones distributed about the perimeter of a space, linked to a computer that records and interprets the results into a coherent form. Arrays may also be formed using numbers of very closely spaced microphones. Given a fixed physical relationship in space between the different individual microphone transducer array elements, simultaneous DSP (digital signal processor) processing of the signals from each of the individual microphone array elements can create one or more "virtual" microphones. Different algorithms permit the creation of virtual microphones with extremely complex virtual polar patterns and even the possibility to steer the individual lobes of the virtual microphones patterns so as to home-in-on, or to reject, particular sources of sound. The application of these algorithms can produce varying levels of accuracy when calculating source level and location, and as such, care should be taken when deciding how the individual lobes of the virtual microphones are derived.

In case the array consists of omnidirectional microphones they accept sound from all directions, so electrical signals of the microphones contain the information about the sounds coming from all directions. Joint processing of these sounds allows selecting the sound signal coming from the given direction.   
   
An array of 1020 microphones, the largest in the world until August 21, 2014, was built by researchers at the MIT Computer Science and Artificial Intelligence Laboratory.

Currently the largest microphone array in the world was constructed by Sorama, a Netherlands-based sound engineering firm, in August 2014.  Their array consists of 4096 microphones.

Soundfield microphone 
The soundfield microphone system is a well-established example of the use of a microphone array in professional sound recording.

See also
 Acoustic camera
 Acoustic source localization
 Ambisonics
 Decca tree
 Microphone
 SOSUS
 Stereophonic sound
 Surround sound

Notes

External links
 Fukada's tree, in an AES paper about Multichannel Music Recording.
 Hamasaki's square, in an AES paper about Multichannel Recording Techniques.
 Literature on source localization with microphone arrays.
 An introduction to Acoustic Holography
 A collection of pages providing a simple introduction to microphone array beamforming

Microphone practices